Events in the year 2008 in Japan.

Incumbents
 Emperor: Akihito
 Prime Minister: Yasuo Fukuda (Liberal Democratic Party–Gunma) to September 24 Taro Aso (L–Fukuoka)
 Chief Cabinet Secretary: Nobutaka Machimura (L–Hokkaidō) to September 24 Takeo Kawamura (L–Yamaguchi)
 Chief Justice of the Supreme Court: Nirō Shimada to November 21 Hironobu Takesaki from November 25
 President of the House of Representatives: Yōhei Kōno (L–Kanagawa)
 President of the House of Councillors: Satsuki Eda (D–Okayama)
 Diet sessions: 168th (extraordinary session continued from 2007, to January 15), 169th (regular, January 18 to June 21), 170th (extraordinary, September 24 to December 25)

Governors
Aichi Prefecture: Masaaki Kanda 
Akita Prefecture: Sukeshiro Terata 
Aomori Prefecture: Shingo Mimura
Chiba Prefecture: Akiko Dōmoto 
Ehime Prefecture: Moriyuki Kato 
Fukui Prefecture: Issei Nishikawa 
Fukuoka Prefecture: Wataru Asō 
Fukushima Prefecture: Yūhei Satō 
Gifu Prefecture: Hajime Furuta
Gunma Prefecture: Masaaki Osawa 
Hiroshima Prefecture: Yūzan Fujita 
Hokkaido: Harumi Takahashi
Hyogo Prefecture: Toshizō Ido
Ibaraki Prefecture: Masaru Hashimoto 
Ishikawa Prefecture: Masanori Tanimoto
Iwate Prefecture: Takuya Tasso
Kagawa Prefecture: Takeki Manabe 
Kagoshima Prefecture: Satoshi Mitazono 
Kanagawa Prefecture: Shigefumi Matsuzawa 
Kochi Prefecture: Masanao Ozaki 
Kumamoto Prefecture: Yoshiko Shiotani (until 16 April); Ikuo Kabashima (starting 16 April)
Kyoto Prefecture: Keiji Yamada 
Mie Prefecture: Akihiko Noro 
Miyagi Prefecture: Yoshihiro Murai
Miyazaki Prefecture: Hideo Higashikokubaru 
Nagano Prefecture: Jin Murai 
Nagasaki Prefecture: Genjirō Kaneko 
Nara Prefecture: Shōgo Arai
Niigata Prefecture: Hirohiko Izumida 
Oita Prefecture: Katsusada Hirose
Okayama Prefecture: Masahiro Ishii 
Okinawa Prefecture: Hirokazu Nakaima
Osaka Prefecture: Fusae Ōta (until 5 February); Tōru Hashimoto (starting 6 February)
Saga Prefecture: Yasushi Furukawa 
Saitama Prefecture: Kiyoshi Ueda 
Shiga Prefecture: Yukiko Kada 
Shiname Prefecture: Zenbe Mizoguchi
Shizuoka Prefecture: Yoshinobu Ishikawa 
Tochigi Prefecture: Tomikazu Fukuda
Tokushima Prefecture: Kamon Iizumi
Tokyo: Shintarō Ishihara 
Tottori Prefecture: Shinji Hirai
Toyama Prefecture: Takakazu Ishii 
Wakayama Prefecture: Yoshinobu Nisaka
Yamagata Prefecture: Hiroshi Saitō 
Yamaguchi Prefecture: Sekinari Nii 
Yamanashi Prefecture: Shōmei Yokouchi

Events

January 31 – Nine people are hospitalized after eating gyōza made at the Tianyang Food Plant in China.
February 11 – Okinawa police arrest United States Marine Tyrone Hadnott and charge him with raping a middle-school girl.
February 19 
Kei Nishikori wins an ATP title. At age 18, he is the youngest player to win the title after Lleyton Hewitt won it at age 16 in 1998.
 A Japanese Maritime Self-Defense Force destroyer Atago collides with fishing boat Seitoku Maru at 4:07 am, off the coast of Chiba Prefecture.
February 22
The Japan Maritime Self-Defense Force resumes fueling warships from the United States and its allies.
Kazuyoshi Miura is arrested in Saipan on suspicion of involvement with the murder of his wife in 1981.
February 25 – The Supreme Court upheld life sentence of Daisuke Mori.
June 8 – The Akihabara massacre takes place in Tokyo. A man kills seven in an attack on a crowd using a truck and a dagger.
June 14 – the 2008 Iwate earthquake strikes northern Honshū, leaving two dead and hundreds injured.
June 17 – Serial killer Tsutomu Miyazaki is executed by hanging.
 July 7 – July 9 – G8 summit hosted by Japan.
 September 6 – Prime Minister Yasuo Fukuda announces his resignation.
 September 24 – The Diet elects Taro Aso Prime Minister.
 October – Toyota launches yet another Avensis at the 2008 Paris Motor Show to be built in Britain.
 October 1 – Arson claims 15 lives in a pre-dawn fire at an adult-video shop in Osaka.
 October 10 (U.S. Pacific Daylight Time) – Kazuyoshi Miura commits suicide in Los Angeles while under arrest on suspicion of involvement in the murder of his wife.
 October 17 – Japan won their tenth nonpermanent seat for 2009 and 2010 sessions on the United Nations Security Council, defeating Iran by 158 votes to 32 in elections in the General Assembly

The Nobel Prize
 Yoichiro Nambu, Makoto Kobayashi (physicist), Toshihide Maskawa: 2008 Nobel Prize in Physics winners.

Deaths 
January 16: Tamako Kataoka, painter
January 17: Jinzō Toriumi, screenwriter
February 13: Kon Ichikawa, film director
February 29: Kenji Yanagiya, fighter ace of the Imperial Japanese Army
March 3: Taichirō Hirokawa, voice actor and narrator
March 11: Akemi Negishi, actress
April 2: Momoko Ishii, author
June 6: Saeko Himuro, novelist, essayist, and playwright
June 9: Kan Mukai, film director, cinematographer, producer and screenwriter
June 17: Tsutomu Miyazaki, serial killer
June 18: Miyuki Kanbe, model and actress
June 27: Daihachi Oguchi, drummer
August 2: Fujio Akatsuka, manga artist
August 4: Eri Kawai, singer
August 11: Arase Nagahide, sumo wrestler
August 14: Seiji Aochi, ski jumper
August 16: Masanobu Fukuoka, microbiologist
October 10: Kazuyoshi Miura, businessman
October 27: Frank Nagai, singer
November 7: Hidetaka Nishiyama, master of Shotokan karate
November 10: Kiyoshi Itō, mathematician
December 5: Shūichi Katō, critic
December 16: Ai Iijima, media personality and AV idol
Undated: Yoshinao Kodaira, officer and fighter ace

See also
 2009 in Japanese music
 2009 in Japanese television
 List of Japanese films of 2009

References 

 
Years of the 21st century in Japan